Fox Sports International was a premium television service in the Netherlands, owned by Eredivisie Media & Marketing CV (in which Fox Networks Group Benelux (part of Fox) had 51% share and football clubs together with Endemol 49%) and launched on 17 August 2013.

The service contained three channels covering several European football leagues and live tennis from the ATP World Tour and WTA Tour.

On 1 October 2020, it was announced that the networks would rebrand as ESPN on 31 December 2020, due to the acquisition of 21st Century Fox by Disney.

Channels
 Fox Sports 4
 Fox Sports 5
 Fox Sports 6

Coverage
Copa America All matches live 
CONCACAF Gold Cup all matches live
Africa Cup of Nations all matches live
UEFA Europa League In Group Stage till Quarterfinal 4 Matches LIVE on Thursday (2 at 19.00 & 2 at 21.00), From Quarterfinal all Matches LIVE (Excluding Game broadcast by RTL 7, except the Final)
CONMEBOL Libertadores
CONMEBOL Sudamericana
CONMEBOL Recopa
 Bundesliga 
 Taca de Portugal Only the Final Live
 Coupe de France Only the Final live
 Scottish Cup Only the Final live
K-League
 NFL
 NHL
 MLB
KBO
 ATP World Tour Masters 1000
 ATP World Tour 500
 ATP World Tour 250
 ATP World Tour Finals
 WTA Tour

External links
 foxsports.nl

References

 

Fox Sports International
Defunct television channels in the Netherlands
Television channels and stations established in 2013
Television channels and stations disestablished in 2020